The Țicleni oil field is an oil field located in Țicleni, Gorj County. It was discovered in 1940 and developed by Petrom. It began production in 1940 and produces oil.

References

Oil fields in Romania